The Manly Fun Pier (or Manly Amusement Pier) was a small amusement park located on a wharf in Manly, New South Wales, Australia. It was in operation from 1931 until its closure in 1989.

History
The Manly Fun Pier started life as a cargo wharf at Manly Cove in the 1850s. In 1927 the cargo wharf was closed and in 1931 it was reopened as the Manly Amusement Pier.
and promoted with the slogan "Built for fun in 31".

During its life, the Fun Pier saw a number of renovations (including a substantial renovation in 1980/81).

It was eventually demolished in the late 1980s when the passenger wharf was extended and redeveloped in 1989.  The new complex opened in 1990 and had an amusement centre in the basement level which was operated by the American company TILT.

The amusement centre closed when the wharf was again substantially redeveloped in 2000.

Attractions
At the time of its alteration in 1980/81, attractions included:
 Shark aquarium (the entrance of which was a large shark mouth)
 Dodgems
 Ghost train. The ghost train had a door which opened out to the water as the train approached, giving the rider the impression that they were about to plunge out into the water.
 Wax museum
 Fun castle
 Ferris Wheel
 merry go-round
 the Octopus ride
 the Space-Walk ride
 Miniature Crazy train ride
 Tumbling house and slide
 the Mexican Whip ride
 Mirror Maze (you would get a medal once completed)

References

External links
  Ad for Manly Seaquarium

Defunct amusement parks in Australia
1931 establishments in Australia
1989 disestablishments in Australia
Amusement parks in New South Wales
Manly, New South Wales
Amusement parks opened in 1931
Amusement parks closed in 1989